Little Costilla Peak is a  mountain summit of the Culebra Range in the U.S. State of New Mexico. Little Costilla Peak is the highest point in Colfax County, New Mexico.


Mountain
As the sixth highest major summit of New Mexico, Little Costilla Peak is a popular hiking destination.

See also

New Mexico
Geography of New Mexico
List of mountain peaks of New Mexico
:Category:Mountains of New Mexico

References

External links

New Mexico state government website
Colfax County, New Mexico government website
Taos County, New Mexico government website
Little Costilla Peak at Carson National Forest
Little Costilla Peak at alltrails.com
Little Costilla Peak at gaiagps.com
Little Costilla Peak at mountainzone.com
Little Costilla Peak at peakbook.org
Little Costilla Peak at peakery.com
Little Costilla Peak at peakvisor.com
Little Costilla Peak at summitpost.org
Little Costilla Peak at youtube.com

Mountains of New Mexico